The Demographics of Tajikistan is about the demography of the population of Tajikistan, including population growth, population density, ethnicity, education level, health, economic status, religious affiliations, and other aspects of the population.

Demographic trends
Tajikistan's main ethnic group are the Tajiks, with minorities such as the Uzbeks and Kyrgyz, and a small Russian minority. Because not everyone in Tajikistan is an ethnic Tajik, the non-Tajik citizens of the country are referred to as Tajikistani. The official nationality of any person from Tajikistan is a Tajikistani, while the ethnic Tajik majority simply call themselves Tajik.

Contemporary Tajiks are an Iranian people. In particular, they are descended from ancient Eastern Iranian peoples of Central Asia, such as the Soghdians and the Bactrians, with an admixture of Western Iranian Persians as well as non-Iranian peoples.

Until the 20th century, people in the region used two types of distinction to identify themselves: way of life - either nomadic or sedentary - and place of residence. By the late nineteenth century, the Tajik and Uzbek peoples, who had lived in proximity for centuries and often used each other's languages, did not perceive themselves as two distinct nationalities. The modern labels were imposed artificially when Central Asia was divided into five Soviet republics in the 1920s.

Historically, Tajikistan and Uzbekistan were also home to Bukharan Jews, who trace their ancestry to the Lost Tribes of Israel taken captive by the Babylonians in the 7th century BC, but almost no Bukharian Jews are left in Tajikistan.

CIA World Factbook demographic statistics

The following demographic statistics are from the CIA World Factbook, unless otherwise indicated.

Ethnic groups

Tajik 84.3%
Pamiris 1%

Uzbek 13.8% 
Other 2% (includes Kyrgyz, Russian, Turkmen, Tatar, Arab)

Ethnic makeup according to the population censuses from 1926 to 2010 (in thousands)
Note: The category Tajiks also includes approximately 135,000 ethnic Pamiris, of which 65% are Shughni speakers, 13% are Rushani speakers, 12% speak Wakhi, 5% are Bartangi speakers, 3% are Yazgulyami speakers, 1.5% speak Khufi, and 0.8% are Ishkashimi speakers. In addition  there are 5,000 speakers of Yagnobi. According to the 2000 census, excluding the people whose native languages are Pamiri or Yagnobi, Tajiks account for 77.6% of the population.

Languages
Several dialects of Persian (Central Asian dialects of Persian) are spoken in Tajikistan and it is one of the two official languages of Tajikistan (officially referred to as Tajik). Russian is the official interethnic language and is widely used in both government and business. The different ethnic minorities speak different languages, for instance Uzbek, Turkmen, Kyrgyz and Khowar. In the Gorno-Badakhshan Autonomous Province, Shughni as well as other Pamir languages are spoken. In the northern Yaghnob valley, the Yaghnobi language is still spoken.

Religion

Sunni Islam 95%
Shia Ismaili Islam 3%
others 2%

Population
9,275,787 (2019 est.) 
According to Worldmeters

Age structure
0–14 years: 34.3% (male 1,282,681/female 1,238,607)
15–64 years: 62.1% (male 2,260,552/female 2,303,034)
65 years and over: 3.6% (male 112,334/female 151,937) (2009 est.)

Population growth rate
1.88% (2009 est.)

2.21% (2013-2014 est.) (source:www.stat.tj)

Net migration rate
-1.28 migrant(s)/1,000 population (2009 est.)

Sex ratio
at birth:
1.05 male(s)/female
under 15 years:
1.04 male(s)/female
15–64 years:
0.98 male(s)/female
65 years and over:
0.74 male(s)/female
total population:
0.99 male(s)/female (2009 est.)

Life expectancy at birth
total population:
65.33 years
male:
62.29 years
female:
68.52 years (2009 est.)

Education
Education is required through high school (11 years of schooling) but completion rate is under 90%;

Literacy
definition:
age 15 and over can read and write
total population:
99.5%
male:
99.7%
female:
99.2% (2000 census)

Vital statistics

UN estimates

Births and deaths

Life Expectancy

Fertility rate
Fertility Rate (TFR) (Wanted Fertility Rate) and CBR (Crude Birth Rate):

Population pyramids
Source:

Birth rate

There were slightly over 224 thousand births in Tajikistan in 2017, down from 230 thousand in 2016. Most births occurred in Khatlon Region (89 thousand births), followed by Sughd Region (61 thousand births) and the Districts of Republican Subordination (53 thousand births). The fewest births is recorded in Gorno-Badakhshan Autonomous Region in eastern Tajikistan, with around 5,700 births. Dushanbe city recorded approximately 15,500 births in 2017.

The crude birth rate for Tajikistan was 25.4‰ in 2017, down from 28.1‰ two years earlier (in 2015). Khatlon Region has the highest birth rate (28.1‰) in 2017, while the city of Dushanbe has the lowest birth rate with 18.8‰.

See also
 Demographics of Central Asia

References

External links

Ethnolinguistic map of Tajikistan by Iraj Bashiri
Dr. Kurbanov, Ruslan. Majority Minoritized by Government: Muslims in Tajikistan. OnIslam.net. May 19, 2012.